Kızılcagedik is a village in the District of Germencik, Aydın Province, Turkey. As of the 2010 Turkish census, the village had a population of 108 people.

References

Villages in Germencik District